Margarita L. Dubocovich, Ph.D., FACNP, FASPET  is an Argentine neuropharmacologist currently a SUNY Distinguished Professor at University of Buffalo, State University of New York.

References

Year of birth missing (living people)
Living people
University at Buffalo faculty
University of Buenos Aires alumni
Fellows of the American Society for Pharmacology and Experimental Therapeutics